Michael Thomas Ferro (born April 19, 1951 in Miami, Florida) is an American politician and a Democratic member of the West Virginia House of Delegates representing District 4 since January 2009.

Education
Ferro earned his BA from West Liberty State College (now West Liberty University), and his MA from West Virginia University.

Elections
2012 When Representative Scott Varner retired and left a seat open, Ferro placed first in the four-way May 8, 2012 Democratic Primary with 3,383 votes (41.3%), and placed first in the three-way two-position November 6, 2012 General election with 8,697 votes (39.1%) ahead of Republican nominee David Evans and fellow Democratic nominee David Sidiropolis.
2008 Ferro challenged incumbent Representatives Kenneth Tucker and Scott Varner in the three-way May 13, 2008 Democratic Primary and placed second with 3,759 votes (33.4%) ahead of Representative Tucker; and placed second in the four-way two-position November 4, 2008 General election with 6,949 votes (29.0%) behind incumbent Representative Varner and ahead of Republican nominee Ronald Morris (who had run for the seat in 2004 and 2006) and Independent candidate R. E. Hartley.
2010 Ferro and Representative Varner were challenged in the three-way May 11, 2010 Democratic Primary where Ferro placed second behind Representative Varner with 3,317 votes (43.0%); they were unopposed for the November 2, 2010 General election where Ferro placed second with 6,894 votes (47.7%).

References

External links
Official page at the West Virginia Legislature

Michael Ferro at Ballotpedia
Michael T. Ferro at the National Institute on Money in State Politics

1951 births
Living people
Democratic Party members of the West Virginia House of Delegates
People from Marshall County, West Virginia
Politicians from Miami
West Liberty University alumni
West Virginia University alumni
21st-century American politicians